Please Advise is a live album by saxophonist Tim Berne's Paraphrase which was recorded in Germany in 1998 and released on Berne's Screwgun label.

Reception
The AllMusic review by William York said "Please Advise continues Berne's streak of quality releases on his Screwgun label during the late '90s, and repays the extra dedication that improvised music of such length requires".

Track listing
All compositions by Tim Berne
 "Critical Mass" - 41:35   
 "Good Evening" - 25:01

Personnel
Tim Berne - alto saxophone, baritone saxophone
Drew Gress - bass
Tom Rainey - drums

References 

1999 live albums
Tim Berne live albums
Screwgun Records live albums